Jean Grumellon (1 June 1923 – 30 December 1991) was a French professional footballer. A striker, he played for Rennes, Lille, Nice, Monaco and Le Havre between 1946 and 1956.

Grumellon was the Ligue 1 topscorer in the 1949-50 season, scoring 25 goals.

References

 FFF profile
 Career stats
 
 

1923 births
1991 deaths
French footballers
France international footballers
Ligue 1 players
Ligue 2 players
OGC Nice players
Lille OSC players
AS Monaco FC players
Le Havre AC players
Stade Rennais F.C. players
Association football forwards